Yandle is a surname. Notable people with the surname include:

Bruce Yandle (born 1933), American economist
Jane Yandle (1844–1915), New Zealand taxidermist
Keith Yandle (born 1986), American professional ice hockey player
Staci Michelle Yandle (born 1961), American judge
Tom Yandle (born 1935)